Scott Bertoli (born March 23, 1977) is a Canadian former professional ice hockey player. He was the Senior Advisor of Hockey Operations for the ECHL's Trenton Titans until their folding.

Prior to turning professional, Bertoli attended Princeton University, where he played four seasons of NCAA Division I college hockey with the Princeton Tigers men's ice hockey team.

On February 21, 2009, the Trenton Devils retired former Titan Kelly Cup champion Scott Bertoli's No. 19 in front of a crowd of 6,013 fans.

Career statistics

Awards and honours

References

External links

1977 births
Canadian ice hockey left wingers
Living people
Lowell Lock Monsters players
Norfolk Admirals players
People from Milton, Ontario
Princeton Tigers men's ice hockey players
Saint John Flames players
Trenton Titans players